Dudley Park may refer to:

 Dudley Park, South Australia
 Dudley Park, Western Australia
 Dudley Conservation Park, South Australia
 Dudley Park, Rangiora, New Zealand